The Shell Creek Shale is a geologic formation in Montana. It preserves fossils dating back to the Cretaceous period.

See also

 List of fossiliferous stratigraphic units in Montana
 Paleontology in Montana

References
 

Shale formations of the United States
Cretaceous Montana